Cryptophlebia repletana is a moth of the family Tortricidae. It is found in South-East Asia, including the Philippines, Sarawak, Taiwan, Fiji and Japan.

The wingspan is 17–21 mm.

References

Moths described in 1863
Grapholitini
Moths of Japan